Inter-Provincial Cricket was a cricket tournament that included the three domestic cricket competitions in Sri Lanka. It started with the Inter-Provincial First Class Tournament in 1990 because of the general idea that club cricket alone would be not enough to keep Sri Lanka cricket competitive.
The tournament stopped after the 1994–95 season but was revived 10 years later with the 2003–04 season and disestablished again in 2010. Sri Lanka remains today as the only Test cricket playing country to have club cricket as their form of first-class cricket with the Premier Trophy. The Inter-Provincial Limited Over Tournament and Inter-Provincial Twenty20 were created for the 2007–08 domestic season. The last First Class Tournament was held in 2009–10. The Twenty20 tournament was last held in 2011 and subsequently replaced by the Sri Lanka Premier League.

History
From the inauguration of the tournament participating teams varied from year to year. 1990 the tournament started with four provincial teams. They were Western Province, Central Province, Southern Province and North Western Province. But in 1991 Western province as the major player contributor to Sri Lankan Cricket had two teams, City team and Suburb team. Then three teams in 1992 and therefore total teams participating was six. 1993 Western province presented three teams again as one City team and two suburban teams. After nearly 10 years of hiatus tournament revived in 2004. Teams yet again changed, only one team from Western province and teams for North Central Province, Uva Province participated for the first time. Then again in 2008 Limited Over Tournament comprised two teams from Western province. For the Twenty20 Tournament 2008 five provincial teams and schools invited team participated.

Teams

Teams participation by series

List of the teams for each tournament as follows.

Teams participation by series, from 2007/08
From the 2007/08 Inter-provincial limited overs tournament started naming teams in Sinhalese.

Current teams

Former Teams

See also
 Inter-Provincial First Class Tournament
 Inter-Provincial Limited Over Tournament
 Inter-Provincial Twenty20

References

External links
 Cricinfo-provincial archive

Sri Lankan domestic cricket competitions